Mohsen Bahramzadeh (born 13 August 1990) is an Iranian weightlifter who won the bronze medal in the Men's 105 kg weight class at the 2013 Asian Weightlifting Championships.

Major results

References

External links 
 
 

1990 births
Living people
Iranian male weightlifters
Iranian strength athletes
21st-century Iranian people